Philichthyidae is a family of copepods, containing the following genera:
Colobomatoides Essafi & Raibaut, 1980
Colobomatus Hesse, 1873
Ichthyotaces Shiino, 1932
Leposphilus Hesse, 1866
Lernaeascus Claus, 1886
Philichthys Steenstrup, 1862
Procolobomatus Castro-Romero & Baeza-Kurok, 1994
Sarcotaces Olsson, 1872
Sphaerifer Richiardi, 1874

References

Poecilostomatoida
Crustacean families